William "Willie" D. Davenport (June 8, 1943 – June 17, 2002) was an American sprint runner. He attended Howland High School and college at Southern University and A&M College in Baton Rouge, Louisiana. He competed in the 110 m hurdles at the 1964, 1968, 1972 and 1976 Summer Olympics, winning a gold medal in 1968 and a bronze in 1976, and finishing fourth in 1972. In 1980 he took part in the Winter Olympics as a runner for the American bobsleigh team.  Because of the boycott, and the quirk of participating in the Winter Olympics, he was the only U.S. track and field athlete to participate in the 1980 Olympics.

Davenport took part in his first Olympics in 1964, but injured his thigh and was eliminated in the semifinals. In Mexico City in 1968, he reached the final and won: "From the first step, the gun, I knew I had won the race." In 1972 he finished fourth, and in his third consecutive Olympic 110 m hurdles final, in 1976, he won a bronze medal. At his last Olympics in 1980 he was a bobsleigh runner, ending up 12th in the four-man competition. Davenport's other achievements include five national championships in the 60 yard hurdles indoor event. By participating in the 1980 bobsleigh competition, he became the first African American to compete in the Winter Olympics for the USA.

Davenport was a member of the Southern Jaguars football team in college, and immediately departed the 1968 Olympics after winning the gold to join the team for the final games. He was drafted by the New Orleans Saints as a wide receiver in the sixth round (138th overall) of the 1969 NFL/AFL draft, but a misunderstanding about his college eligibility prompted the Saints to withdraw the selection. When it turned out he was allowed to play, the San Diego Chargers picked him in the 16th round (408th overall) but he and the team could not agree to a contract. The Saints drafted him again in 1970 in the 12th round (296th overall) as a defensive back, though he did not join them either.

In 1985, Davenport competed at the Masters Outdoor World Championship in Rome.

Davenport was a U.S. Army private at the time of his first Olympic participation, he was a Colonel in the United States Army National Guard at the time of his death. He died of a heart attack at age 59 at Chicago's O'Hare International Airport on June 17, 2002.

In 1977 he was inducted into the Mt. SAC Relays Hall of Fame, and in 1982 into the National Track and Field Hall of Fame.

References

Further reading
 Wallechinsky, David (1984). The Complete Book of the Olympics: 1896 – 1980. New York: Penguin Books. pp. 54–55, 562.

External links

 
 
 
 

1943 births
2002 deaths
American male hurdlers
Olympic bobsledders of the United States
American male bobsledders
Athletes (track and field) at the 1964 Summer Olympics
Athletes (track and field) at the 1967 Pan American Games
Athletes (track and field) at the 1968 Summer Olympics
Athletes (track and field) at the 1972 Summer Olympics
Athletes (track and field) at the 1976 Summer Olympics
Bobsledders at the 1980 Winter Olympics
People from Troy, Alabama
United States Army officers
Olympic gold medalists for the United States in track and field
Olympic bronze medalists for the United States in track and field
Pan American Games silver medalists for the United States
Pan American Games medalists in athletics (track and field)
Southern University alumni
Track and field athletes from Alabama
World record setters in athletics (track and field)
Medalists at the 1976 Summer Olympics
Medalists at the 1968 Summer Olympics
Universiade medalists in athletics (track and field)
Universiade bronze medalists for the United States
Medalists at the 1965 Summer Universiade
Medalists at the 1967 Pan American Games